George Lawrence Davis (1830-1894) was commended to Madrid (Spain) from Leominster (Herefordshire) in 1863 to preach the gospel.

For some years he traveled through Spain with a Bible Carriage, dubbed "the armored vehicle". After an escape from being shot at, he moved to Gràcia (Barcelona), where he established free schools for children and adults. There, he also published magazines containing different educational and religious topics, such as La Aurora de la Gracia. He also founded a hospital that would be the embryo of the current “Hospital Evangèlic” in Barcelona.

Looking for healthcare he came to Caldes de Montbui, a spa town near Barcelona, where he settled. Here he founded and directed a school known as "Escola dels Pobres" and a church called "Església Evangèlica Caldes de Montbui". In acknowledgment of his charitable work, one of the downtown streets in Caldes de Montbui is now named after him.

References

External links 
 The Gospel in Spain. George Lawrence, 1872.
 Sketches from Missionary Life in Spain. Ernesto Trenchard, 1934.
 Exposició George Lawrence. Biblioteca de Caldes de Montbui, 2014.
 Esglesia Evangèlica de Caldes de Montbui, 2020.

1830 births
1894 deaths
Welsh Protestant missionaries
Welsh evangelicals
People from Monmouth, Wales
British Plymouth Brethren
Protestant missionaries in Spain
British expatriates in Spain